Maria Mestre de los Dolores Andreu (April 25, 1801after 1860) was an American known as the second US Coastguard female employee. A lighthouse keeper, she was the first Hispanic-American woman to command a federal shore installation. Marilyn Dykman said of her "Maria Andreu's leadership and perseverance as keeper of the lighthouse inspired generations of women to shine as female employees within federal service through her beacon of light."

Early life 
Andreu was born on April 25, 1801 to parents Bartholomew Mestre and Marianna Lorenzo Mestre, and baptized on April 30 of the same year. She married Joseph Juan Andreu on May 6, 1822; Joseph Andreu served as  keeper of the St. Augustine Lighthouse from 1854–1859. The couple had eight children.

Career 
Andreu was the first Hispanic woman to serve in the Coast Guard and the first to command a federal shore installation. She became keeper of the lighthouse on January 7, 1860, after her husband Joseph, who had been the lighthouse keeper since 1854, died. According to a report in the St. Augustine Examiner on December 10, 1859, he was whitewashing the tower when the scaffolding collapsed and he fell about 60 feet onto the roof of the building where oil for the light was stored. Joseph Andreu was a cousin of the first St. Augustine lighthouse keeper, Juan Andreu, who served from 1824-1845. Joseph's father, Tomas, was the brother of Juan's father, Antonio.

Maria served as keeper at a salary of $400 a year until 1861, when the light was ordered darkened by the then Confederate States Secretary of the Navy, Stephen Mallory, and George C. Gibbs. She is believed to have left St. Augustine and moved to Georgia, where she spent the rest of her life in obscurity.

References 

1801 births
Year of death unknown
United States Lighthouse Service personnel
Women lighthouse keepers